Côn River (also Kôn River, Sông Kôn) is a river of Vietnam. With a length of 171 km, it is the longest river in Bình Định Province. Much of it can be used as an inland waterway for transportation.

It has its source at Ngọc Roo mountain at 925m above sea level in the border region of the provinces Kontum and Gia Lai. It flows through the districts of An Lão, Vĩnh Thạnh, Tây Sơn, Vân Canh, An Nhơn và Tuy Phước. Kon River basin suffers from flood damage almost every year, especially in the
downstream areas from Thi Nai wetland.

Côn River flows through the artificial Định Bình Lake in Vĩnh Thạnh District.

Land use
In the basins, more than 50% of the upstream areas of the Kon River and the Ha Thanh River are classified as forest land. Whereas in the delta area of the Kon River, i.e. An Nhon and Tuy Phuoc districts, approximately 40 to 50 percent is farmland.

References

Rivers of Bình Định province
Rivers of Vietnam